The 2019 SMU Mustangs women's soccer team represented Southern Methodist University during the 2019 NCAA Division I women's soccer season. The regular season began on August 22 and concluded on October 31. It was the program's 26th season fielding a women's varsity soccer team, and their 7th season in the AAC. The 2019 season was Chris Petrucelli's eighth year as head coach for the program.

Roster

Schedule 

|-
!colspan=6 style=""| Non-conference regular season
|-

|-
!colspan=6 style=""| American Athletic Conference regular season
|-

|-
!colspan=6 style=""| American Athletic Conference Tournament
|-

|-

Rankings

See also 
 2019 SMU Mustangs men's soccer team

References 

2019 American Athletic Conference women's soccer season
2019 in sports in Texas
SMU Mustangs women's soccer